Elizabeth II was Queen of Tanganyika from 1961 to 1962, when Tanganyika was an independent sovereign state and a constitutional monarchy. She was also the monarch of other sovereign states, including the United Kingdom. Her constitutional roles in Tanganyika were mostly delegated to the governor-general of Tanganyika.

History

The monarchy was created by the Tanganyika Independence Act 1961 which transformed the United Nations trust territory of Tanganyika into an independent sovereign constitutional monarchy.

Prince Philip, Duke of Edinburgh represented the Queen of Tanganyika at the independence celebrations. On 9 December 1961, the Duke presented Tanganyika's instrument of independence to Julius Nyerere, who then became the Prime Minister of independent Tanganyika. Dar es Salaam was made a city, when the Duke presented the Royal Charter and Letters Patent. He was then made the first Freeman of Dar es Salaam, and afterwards told the gathering: "A new mantle of dignity and responsibility has fallen on the citizens of Dar es Salaam". On 11 December, the Duke formally opened the first session of the parliament of independent Tanganyika, on behalf of the Queen, before an assembly of people and diplomats, at a ceremony of pomp and colour. Richard Turnbull, the Governor-General, addressed the Duke, asking him to open Parliament by reading the Speech from the Throne.

Constitutional role

Tanganyika was one of the realms of the Commonwealth of Nations that shared the same person as Sovereign and head of state.

Effective with the Tanganyika Independence Act 1961, no British government minister could advise the sovereign on any matters pertaining to Tanganyika, meaning that on all matters of Tanganyika, the monarch was advised solely by Tanganyikan ministers of the Crown. All Tanganyikan bills required Royal assent. The Tanganyikan monarch was represented in the realm by the Governor-General of Tanganyika, who was appointed by the monarch on the advice of the Tanganyikan Prime Minister.

The Crown and Government

The Government of Tanganyika was officially known as Her Majesty's Government.

The Tanganyikan monarch and the National Assembly of Tanganyika constituted the Parliament of Tanganyika. All executive powers of Tanganyika rested with the sovereign. All laws in Tanganyika were enacted only with the granting of Royal Assent, done by the Governor-General on behalf of the sovereign. The Governor-General could reserve a bill "for the Queen's pleasure"; that is withhold his consent to the bill and present it to the sovereign for her personal decision; or he could veto it completely by withholding his assent therefrom. The Governor-General was also responsible for summoning, proroguing, and dissolving Parliament. The Governor-General had the power to choose and appoint the Council of Ministers and could dismiss them under his discretion. All Tanganyikan ministers of the Crown held office at the pleasure of the Governor-General.

The Crown and the Courts

The highest court of appeal for Tanganyika was the Judicial Committee of the Privy Council. The monarch, and by extension the governor-general, could also grant immunity from prosecution, exercise the royal prerogative of mercy, and pardon offences against the Crown, either before, during, or after a trial.

Title
By a proclamation in the Tanganyika Gazette in January 1962, the monarch was granted a separate Tanganyikan title in her role as Queen of Tanganyika.

Elizabeth II had the following styles in her role as the monarch of Tanganyika:

9 December 1961 – 12 January 1962: Elizabeth the Second, by the Grace of God, of the United Kingdom of Great Britain and Northern Ireland and of Her other Realms and Territories Queen, Head of the Commonwealth, Defender of the Faith
12 January 1962 – 9 December 1962: Elizabeth the Second, Queen of Tanganyika and of Her Other Realms and Territories, Head of the Commonwealth

Cultural role and public understanding
The Round Table: The Commonwealth Journal of International Affairs wrote:

Abolition
The Tanganyikan monarchy was abolished on 9 December 1962, and Tanganyika became a republic within the Commonwealth with the president of Tanganyika as head of state.

The Queen sent a message to the new President Julius Nyerere, in which she said:

Tanganyika merged with Zanzibar in 1964 after the Zanzibar Revolution to form Tanzania. Queen Elizabeth visited Tanzania on 19–22 July 1979, visiting Arusha, Dar es Salaam, Zanzibar, and Kilimanjaro.

Gallery

References

Government of Tanzania
Politics of Tanganyika
Tanganyika
Heads of state of Tanganyika
1961 establishments in Tanganyika
1962 disestablishments in Tanganyika
Tanganyika
Former monarchies of Africa
History of Tanganyika
Titles held only by one person